"You aren't gonna need it" (YAGNI) is a principle which arose from extreme programming (XP) that states a programmer should not add functionality until deemed necessary. Other forms of the phrase include "You aren't going to need it" (YAGTNI)  and "You ain't gonna need it" (YAGNI).

Ron Jeffries, a co-founder of XP, explained the philosophy: "Always implement things when you actually need them, never when you just foresee that you [will] need them." John Carmack wrote "It is hard for less experienced developers to appreciate how rarely architecting for future requirements / applications turns out net-positive."

Context
YAGNI is a principle behind the XP practice of "do the simplest thing that could possibly work" (DTSTTCPW). It is meant to be used in combination with several other practices, such as continuous refactoring, continuous automated unit testing, and continuous integration. Used without continuous refactoring, it could lead to disorganized code and massive rework, known as technical debt. YAGNI's dependency on supporting practices is part of the original definition of XP.

See also

 
 
 Don't repeat yourself
 Feature creep
 If it ain't broke, don't fix it
 KISS principle
 Minimum viable product
 MoSCoW method
 Muntzing 
 Overengineering
 Single-responsibility principle
 SOLID
 Unix philosophy
 Worse is better

References 

Software development philosophies
Programming principles